is a 1992 fighting arcade game developed and published by Alpha Denshi (later known as ADK) with the assistance of SNK. It was originally released for the Neo Geo MVS arcade cabinet on July 28, 1992. It is ADK's first game in the fighting game genre, as well as their earliest attempt in the fighting game trend of the '90s that was popularized by Capcom's 1991 arcade hit Street Fighter II. It was even the last game with the "Alpha" logo labeled within the game before the developer became "ADK"; however, the "Alpha" logo was last used on one of the arcade flyers of its sequel.

Due to its success in the market, World Heroes was followed by a sequel released less than a year later titled World Heroes 2.

Gameplay 

World Heroes is controlled with three of the four buttons ("A" to punch, "B" to kick and "C" to throw) used along with an 8-way joystick on the Neo Geo MVS arcade cabinet. The punches and kicks have two levels, weak and strong. In order to get each strength with just two buttons, the punch and kick buttons have to be pressed briefly for weak and longer for strong. This same mechanic even can be performed with special moves. The throw button C, if close enough to the opponent, grabs and throws the opponent across the stage; however, if holding the joystick in the opposite direction at the right time, the opponent would be tossed the opposite direction. Introduced in the fighting game genre by World Heroes are some abilities exclusive to some characters that were used in several later fighting games, such as multi-jumping using Hanzou and Fuuma, and shooting projectiles from the air using Rasputin.

There are eight playable characters in the roster and two different play modes for players to choose from: "Normal Game" and "Death Match". In "Normal Game", players have to defeat the other seven playable characters in a random order, followed by a battle against the final boss Geegus (misspelled as "Gee Gus" in localized English versions), all by using the chosen character. If the player defeats an opponent, the player moves on to the next opponent. After the third battle, the player has a bonus round to carve a block of stone into a statue in ten seconds with repeated hits. After the sixth battle, the player has another bonus round to break falling pots in ten seconds before they hit the ground.

"Death Match" acts like Normal Mode with a difference. Players will fight in a ring with environmental hazards such as electrical barriers, spiked walls, oil puddles and others which players must avoid while fighting. Players also can force their opponents against the environmental hazards to their advantage.  Also, unlike the normal game where battles take place in various locations, all death match battles take place in a closed boxing-esque arena setting, and take place in front of a live audience.

Plot
In the distant future, Dr. Sugar Brown: a well-renowned and famous scientist is determined to figure out on who the strongest fighter of history is and has gone to great lengths in order to finally gain the answer of his own question. Through the use of a time machine that he had built, Dr. Brown has brought together several of the world's most powerful super heroes throughout each century so that all of them can compete and take part in a one-on-one fighting/death-match tournament that Dr. Brown has organized, the tournament itself being used as a way to determine on who the strongest fighter of history is. Little does Dr. Brown and the participating fighters know and realize that an unknown threat is secretly watching them during the progression of the tournament and that this unknown threat could easily endanger them and the rest of the world.

Characters

Hattori Hanzo (服部 半蔵, Hattori Hanzō), the protagonist of the game, is the head of Iga ninja clan, during the Ashikaga Shogunate. He sent to a world unknown to him, he continues to train and obtain enlightenment as a warrior, and considers himself naive, though he has hopes to one day be the greatest. It's rival of Fuuma Kotaro.
Kotaro Fuuma (風魔 小太郎, Fūma Kotarō), the fifth leader of Fuuma ninja clan and Hanzo's rival. Unlike his enemy, he's an easy going womanizer who doesn't like to work any harder than he has to. He also adopts to the new culture that he's in and is excited by change.
Kim Dragon (キム・ドラゴン / 金龍, Kim Dragon), a famous Korean-Chinese martial-arts movie star in the 20th century. His career is compared to that of singers, but he wants to be a great fighter as well, just like his idol Bruce Lee. He enters the World Heroes tournament to prove his point.
Jeanne D'Arc (ジャンヌ・ダルク, Jannu Daruku), a Frenchwoman from the 15th century who has a mastery at fencing. A bearer of a tremendous beauty, she roamed her land in search of a strong fighter to become her husband. However, she continues her search in a different time now.
J. Carn (J・カーン, Jei Kān), the heroic leader of the Mongolian marauding horde, this juggernaut warrior is the strongest fighter of his army. He led the powerful soldiers into many victories and conquests throughout Eurasia.
Muscle Power (マッスル•パワー, Massuru Pawā), an American all-star pro-wrestler. He also strongly believes his own power of his muscles is #1. He fights in the World Heroes tournament to prove it. He dreams of making a name for himself in the pro-wrestling world.
Brocken (ブロッケン, Burokken), is a cyborg developed by Dr. Brown initially for the army of Nazi Germany. After their final defeat in World War II, he travels the world to prove that the power of science is the greatest of them all.
Rasputin (ラスプーチン, Rasupūchin, Cyrillic: Распутин), the leader of a love cult based on Russia. He is also a sorcerer with great knowledge of magic, and fights the other World Heroes, preaching about the love all mankind should have.
Geegus (ギガス, Gigasu), the final boss who is an artificial polymorphic experiment from the future, created by a mad scientist named Damned. It is sent to the past multiple times to slaughter anyone that crosses its way, intending to invade and conquer planets.

Development
According to ADK World, the other famous and infamous figures that were considered for the cast were Al Capone, Billy the Kid, Musashi Miyamoto, Hanzo Hattori, Napoleon Bonaparte, Adolf Hitler, and Jack the Ripper. A Korean warrior who was the game's intended sub-boss, and an Egyptian warrior were also in the works.

Out of the entire prototype lineup, Hattori was the only one kept for the final product. Hitler was taken and reworked into a different Nazi-based fictional character named Brocken to avoid controversy. Jack was also redesigned and later added to the cast in World Heroes 2 Jet.  Miyamoto's character was instead used in other SNK titles such as The Last Blade, the Samurai Shodown series and Ganryu.

Ports and related releases
World Heroes was later ported to the Neo Geo AES in both Japan and North America on September 11, 1992, which is identical to the Neo Geo MVS version, but designed for home gaming, just like nearly every AES versions of Neo Geo titles. World Heroes was later ported to the Neo Geo CD exclusively in Japan by ADK on March 17, 1995 and then to North America in October 1996, which is the same as the MVS and AES versions, but with arranged background music.

Besides SNK's consoles, it was first ported by Sunsoft to the SNES in Japan on August 12, 1993, in North America in September 1993, and PAL regions in 1993. Later, it was ported to the Sega Mega Drive / Genesis by Sega Midwest Studio (then known as Sega Midwest Development Division) exclusively in North America on August 16, 1994. The Neo Geo AES version was also added to the Wii's Virtual Console first in Japan on September 28, 2007, then in North America on October 8, 2007, and in Europe on October 19, 2007. Later, it was added to a compilation of Neo Geo arcade games for the PlayStation 2, PlayStation Portable and Wii titled SNK Arcade Classics Vol. 1 as an unlockable game.

On October 18, 2007, SNK Playmore added it with its three sequels to the arcade game compilation  in Japan for the PlayStation 2. It was later published in North America on March 11, 2008, and in Europe on November 7, 2008, both titled as World Heroes Anthology. This was created to celebrate the 15th Anniversary of the World Heroes series. This compilation was later reprinted as part of a series of best-sellers labeled "The Best" in Japan on June 18, 2009.

Reception

The arcade version was commercially successful upon release. It was said to be one of the first games that brought the attention of SNK's consoles to game players. In Japan, Game Machine listed World Heroes on their September 1, 1992 issue as being the third most-popular arcade game at the time.

In the United States, on RePlay magazine's coin-op earnings charts, World Heroes topped the software conversion kits chart in July 1992, ranking just above Capcom's Street Fighter II. RePlay then reported World Heroes to be the most-popular arcade game in September 1992. It was then the top-grossing software conversion kit during October to November 1992, and then again in January 1993. On the April 1993 charts, it was the fifth highest-earning software conversion kit. On the May 1993 chart, it dropped to number-eight, with World Heroes 2 at number-five. It was one of America's top five highest-grossing arcade games of 1993.

Critical reception
The September 1992 issue of Sinclair User gave the arcade game a score of 81%. The October 1993 issue of Computer and Video Games scored it 74%.

On release in the home retail market, Famicom Tsūshin scored the Neo Geo console version of the game a 22 out of 40. GameFans two reviewers scored the Neo Geo console version 92% and 90%. One of the reviewers stated "that it is NOT just another Street Fighter 2 clone", praising the "all new" and "unique" moves and characters, and "the weapons and added Death Match." The other called it "a great fighting game" that rivals Street Fighter II and is "surpassed only by Art of Fighting."

Electronic Gaming Monthly gave the Genesis version a 26 out of 50, commenting that "The Super NES version was a good Neo Geo reproduction, but this one completely misses! The action is incredibly slow (and a bit choppy) and the voices are horrendous!" GamePro criticized the Genesis version as well, citing slow action, mediocre graphics, poor sound, and hapless opponent AI. In 2018, Complex rated World Heroes 62nd in their "The Best Super Nintendo Games of All Time".

Promotion
Early pictures of the Super NES version of the game were presented at the 1993 Winter Consumer Electronics Show.

Notes

References

External links 
 
 World Heroes at GameFAQs
 World Heroes at Giant Bomb
 World Heroes at Killer List of Videogames
 World Heroes at MobyGames

1992 video games
ACA Neo Geo games
ADK (company) games
Arcade video games
D4 Enterprise games
Fighting games
2D fighting games
Multiplayer and single-player video games
Neo Geo games
Neo Geo CD games
Nintendo Switch games
PlayStation Network games
PlayStation 4 games
Sega Genesis games
SNK games
Super Nintendo Entertainment System games
Video games about time travel
Video games scored by Brian L. Schmidt
Video games scored by Hideki Yamamoto
Video games scored by Hiroaki Shimizu
Video games scored by Yuka Watanabe
Video games set in Germany
Video games set in Japan
Video games set in Russia
Video games set in the United States
Video games set in Mongolia
Video games set in the Mongol Empire
Video games set in France
Virtual Console games
Windows games
Xbox One games
Video games developed in Japan
Hamster Corporation games